The 1907 Nobel Prize in Literature was awarded to the British writer Rudyard Kipling (1865–1936) "in consideration of the power of observation, originality of imagination, virility of ideas and remarkable talent for narration which characterize the creations of this world-famous author." He is the first English-language writer to receive the prize, and being aged 41, is its youngest recipient to date.

Laureate

 
Rudyard Kipling praised the British colonial empire in his works as a poet, short story author, journalist, and novelist, which made his poetry well-liked in the British Army. Children all across the globe have grown to know and love him as a result of The Jungle Book (1894), especially because of Disney's 1967 motion picture adaptation. The Swedish Academy said that Kipling's human portraits and social environment descriptions that "penetrate to the substance of things" rather than merely repeating the fleeting" were his distinctive qualities. His classic literary works include Kim (1901), the Just So Stories (1902) and many short stories, including The Man Who Would Be King (1888).

Deliberations

Nominations
Kipling was nominated four times beginning in 1904. He was nominated in 1907 by Charles Oman, professor of modern history at the University of Oxford, which later led to him being awarded the Nobel prize.

In total, the Swedish Academy received 37 nominations for 21 individuals. The highest number of nominations – five nominations – were for the Italian writer Angelo de Gubernatis followed by American theologian Borden Parker Bowne with four nominations. Eight of the nominees were nominated first-time such as Holger Drachmann, Eduardo Benot, Andrés Manjón, Àngel Guimerà, and Paul Bourget. Selma Lagerlöf is the only female nominee for that year.

The authors Thomas Bailey Aldrich, Mary Elizabeth Coleridge, Mary De Morgan, Charles Guérin, Louise Granberg, Benedikt Sveinbjarnarson Gröndal, Bogdan Petriceicu Hasdeu, Joris-Karl Huysmans, Alfred Jarry, Mkrtich Khrimian, Hector Malot, David Masson, Bertram Fletcher Robinson, André Theuriet, Marko Vovchok, Iosif Vulcan, and Stanisław Wyspiański died in 1907 without having been nominated for the prize. The British minister Ian Maclaren and Spanish academic Eduardo Benot died months before the announcement.

Award Ceremony
At the award ceremony in Stockholm on 10 December 1907, the Permanent Secretary of the Swedish Academy, Carl David af Wirsén, praised both Kipling and three centuries of English literature, saying:

"The Swedish Academy, in awarding the Nobel Prize in Literature this year to Rudyard Kipling, desires to pay a tribute of homage to the literature of England, so rich in manifold glories, and to the greatest genius in the realm of narrative that that country has produced in our times."

Notes

References

External links
Award ceremony speech by C.D. af Wirsén nobelprize.org

1907
Rudyard Kipling